Faraquet  is an American post-hardcore band from Washington D.C., United States, sometimes placed in the math rock genre. The trio formed in 1997 and disbanded in 2001 after releasing its debut full-length on Dischord Records. Faraquet were influenced by D.C.-based peers like Fugazi, Jawbox, and Nation of Ulysses as well as progressive rock bands like King Crimson. The band has recently reissued all of the material released prior to their full-length and briefly reformed to play shows in support of this project in Brazil and their native Washington, D.C.

Following Faraquet's dissolution, Molter and Ocampo went on to form Medications, which released an EP and two albums on Dischord Records before going on hiatus in 2011. Devin currently plays in the EFFECTS, who have released one full-length (also on Dischord).

Personnel

Lineup
Devin Ocampo: vocals, guitar, drums/percussion, keyboards, banjo, baritone guitar, trumpet.
Chad Molter: drums/percussion, vocals, piccolo bass
Jeff Boswell: bass, feedback guitar, Moog

Formation
Devin Ocampo (guitar) and Chad Molter (drums/percussion) moved from New York City to Washington, D.C. to further pursue their musical aspirations. Ocampo had many side projects in the early '90s, one of which was playing drums for fellow D.C. band, Smart Went Crazy. Smart Went Crazy was where Ocampo met future Faraquet bass player, Jeff Boswell. Boswell joined Ocampo and Molter to form Faraquet in 1997.

Discography

Singles
 "Parakeet" b/w "Um Die Ecke" (Mis En Scene Records: 002) (1998)
 "Whole Thing Over" b/w "Call It Sane" (DeSoto Records:32) (1999)

EPs
 'Split EP' with Akarso (404 Records: 404–002) (1999)

Albums
 The View from this Tower (Dischord Records: 122) (2000)

Compilation albums
 Anthology 1997-98 (Dischord 159) - July 28, 2008Released in Brazil in 2007 as Faraquet by the label Mis-en-scene

References

External links
 Southern.com
 Faraquet interview with Held Like Sound
 Myspace Page

American post-hardcore musical groups
Math rock groups
Musical groups from Washington, D.C.